The masked palm civet (Paguma larvata), also called the gem-faced civet or Himalayan palm civet, is a viverrid species native to the Indian subcontinent and Southeast Asia. It has been listed as least concern on the IUCN Red List since 2008 as it occurs in many protected areas, is tolerant to some degree of habitat modification, and widely distributed with presumed large populations that are unlikely to be declining.

The genus Paguma was first named and described by John Edward Gray in 1831. All described forms are regarded as a single species.

In 2003, masked palm civets at a wildlife market in China were found to have been infected with the severe acute respiratory syndrome coronavirus.

Characteristics 

The masked palm civet's fur is grayish to ochraceous, black on the head, shoulders and neck, and blackish brown on the tail and feet. It has a white blaze on the forehead; white marks above and below the eyes extend to the ears, forming a half-collar.
In morphology the masked palm civet resembles other palm civets, but does not have spots or stripes. Its tail is more than two-thirds the length of head and body. It has two pairs of mammae.

The whitish mask extends laterally to the far edges of the cheeks and caudally up the forehead, past the ears, and down the back of the neck before stopping just under the shoulder blades. The eyes are surrounded by white fur that can vary from faint, incomplete outlines to well-defined blotches. The lips, chin, and throat are white. In some, white stripes of fur, comparable to sideburns on humans due to shape and location, curve up from the throat. These curves vary in thickness and have ends that terminate either in small blotches at the ear base or large blotches that surround the base of both darkly furred ears.

The species having a large repartition, differences in morphological parameters can be observable in different populations.

Distribution and habitat 
The masked palm civet is distributed from the northern parts of the Indian subcontinent, especially the Himalayas, ranging eastwards across Bhutan, Bangladesh, Myanmar, Thailand, Peninsular Malaysia, Laos, Cambodia, Vietnam to China, Borneo, Sumatra, Taiwan, and the Andaman and Nicobar islands. It was introduced to Mainland Japan and Ryukyu Islands.
It has been recorded in both evergreen and deciduous forest, and in disturbed habitat. It also inhabits fragmented forest habitats, albeit at reduced density.

It is also found in Japan, where genetic studies indicate that it is an introduced species with multiple introductions over the centuries, at least two of which are from Taiwan.

Ecology and behaviour 
The masked palm civet is a nocturnal solitary predator that is occasionally active during the day.
It is partly arboreal.

When alarmed, the animal sprays a secretion from its anal gland against the predator. The spray is similar in function to that of a skunk, and its conspicuousness serves to deter other predators.

Feeding and diet 
The masked palm civet is an omnivore feeding on rats and birds as well as on fruit such as figs, mangoes, bananas, and leaves. Scat analysis indicates that they also eat mollusks, arthropods, bark and to a lesser extent snakes and frogs. The composition of the diet varies between seasons and sites.

Reproduction 
Masked palm civets are polyestrous and their mating behavior is promiscuous. There are two breeding seasons per year. The female bears up to four young. Masked palm civets are known to reach 15 years of age in captivity.

Copulation in masked palm civets can last for more than 30 minutes. Upon completion of copulation, males leave a copulation plug in the female's vaginal tract. The young grow to the size of an adult in about three months.

Threats 

The major threats for the masked palm civet are continued habitat destruction and hunting for bushmeat. It is widely offered in restaurants in southern China and is also eaten in Vietnam. Masked palm civets are often victims of illegal animal trafficking to meet the demands in China and Vietnam; 100 civets were confiscated in April 2021.  Despite relocation to Save Vietnam Wildlife, a wildlife rehabilitator, at least 8 civets died due to stress and injuries.

Conservation
Paguma larvata is protected in Malaysia and China, but not Thailand and Nepal. The population of India is listed on CITES Appendix III.

Connection with SARS 
In May 2003, the SARS virus was isolated in several masked palm civets found in a wildlife market in Guangdong, China. Evidence of virus infection was also detected in other animals including a raccoon dog, and in humans working at the same market.
In 2006, scientists from the Chinese Centre for Disease Control and Prevention of the University of Hong Kong and the Guangzhou Centre for Disease Control and Prevention established a direct genetic link between the SARS coronavirus appearing in civets and humans, bearing out claims that the disease had jumped across species.

See also 
Asian palm civet
Small Indian civet
Malabar large-spotted civet

References

External links 

 

Viverrids
Mammals of Southeast Asia
Mammals of Borneo
Mammals of Myanmar
Mammals of Cambodia
Mammals of China
Mammals of India
Mammals of Indonesia
Mammals of Japan
Mammals of Laos
Mammals of Nepal
Mammals of Pakistan
Mammals of Taiwan
Mammals of Thailand
Mammals of Vietnam
Fauna of Sumatra
Fauna of the Himalayas
Carnivorans of Malaysia
Mammals described in 1827
Taxa named by Charles Hamilton Smith